Pop Warner Little Scholars, commonly known simply as Pop Warner,  is a nonprofit organization that provides activities such as American football, for over 425,000 youths aged 5 to 16 years old, in  several nations. It is the largest youth football organization in the United States.  

Its headquarters are in Langhorne, Pennsylvania. Pop Warner Little Scholars is named after football coach Pop Warner, who heavily contributed to the organization in its early years.

Age and weight divisions

Some divisions allow "older but lighter" players who meet the age and weight requirements in parentheses.

Safety and brain health

In the 2010s, there has been much controversy about football and brain health, with a number of studies focusing not just on the occasional concussion, but also on the large number of sub-concussive hits. One game in particular in 2012 resulted in five concussions. In 2015, a family sued Pop Warner over the suicide of a former player who was later found to have chronic traumatic encephalopathy (CTE), claiming that the organization knew or should have known about the risk of head injuries. Several other lawsuits have been filed against Pop Warner for related cases.

In 2016, the Pop Warner league banned kickoffs in an attempt to reduce high-speed collisions that result in concussions.

A 2018 study found that tackle football before age 12 was correlated with earlier onset of symptoms of CTE, but not with symptom severity.  There have also been advocates for flag football only before certain ages.

References

External links 
 
 

Children's sport
Youth sport in the United States
American football in the United States
American football organizations
1929 establishments in the United States
Sports organizations established in 1929
American football in Pennsylvania